Anime Milwaukee (AMKE) is an annual three-day anime convention held during February at the Wisconsin Center & Hilton Milwaukee City Center in Milwaukee, Wisconsin. It is Wisconsin's largest anime convention.

Programming
The convention typically offers anime music videos, an art contest, artist alley, charity ball, cosplay chess, a dealer's room, fashion show, maid cafe, manga library, masquerade, movies, rave, tabletop gaming, and video game tournaments. The convention runs for 24 hours a day.

The 2017 charity ball benefited the Milwaukee LGBT Community Center.

History
Anime Milwaukee began in 2007 and was founded by the Japanese Animation Association at the University of Wisconsin-Milwaukee. In 2011, the convention moved to the Hyatt Regency & Frontier Airlines Center in Milwaukee, which allowed for 24-hour programming. Attendees who preregistered for Anime Milwaukee in 2013 could receive a discount for the Distant Worlds concert held the day before the convention on February 14, 2013. The convention shared space in 2014 at the Wisconsin Center with Pheasant Fest, a hunting convention. The combined conventions economic impact were expected to be $1.5 million.

In 2015, Anime Milwaukee's expected economic impact was over $1 million and it shared Wisconsin Center space with the Midwest Twisters Gymnastics Invitational. The convention brought $1.2 million to the local economy in 2016. Anime Milwaukee in 2017 occupied all the floors of the Wisconsin Center to expand panels and video gaming. The convention was estimated to bring $2.5-$3 million to the local economy. Anime Milwaukee was estimated to bring $4 million to the local economy in 2019. Anime Milwaukee 2021 was cancelled due to the COVID-19 pandemic. Anime Milwaukee had COVID-19 policies in 2022 that included mandatory masks, with ether vaccination or a negative test.

Event history

References

External links
Official website

Anime conventions in the United States
Recurring events established in 2008
2008 establishments in Wisconsin
Annual events in Wisconsin
Wisconsin culture
Tourist attractions in Milwaukee
Festivals in Milwaukee
University of Wisconsin–Milwaukee
Conventions in Wisconsin